Legends is an American crime drama television series which aired on TNT from August 13, 2014 to December 28, 2015. Developed by Howard Gordon, Jeffrey Nachmanoff, and Mark Bomback, the series is based on the 2005 book Legends: A Novel of Dissimulation written by Robert Littell. On December 4, 2014, TNT renewed Legends for a 10-episode second season, which premiered on November 2, 2015. On December 15, 2015, TNT canceled the series after two seasons and 20 episodes.

Premise
Martin Odum (Bean) is an undercover FBI agent who changes himself into a different person for each case. A "mysterious stranger" (played by Billy Brown) causes him to question his sanity.

Cast

Season 1
Sean Bean as Martin Odum, an undercover agent working for the FBI's Division of Covert Operations (DCO) who struggles with his real identity outside of his legends.
Ali Larter as Crystal McGuire, a fellow operative who has a brief romantic history with Martin.
Morris Chestnut as Tony Rice, an FBI agent who is trying to uncover secrets he believes Martin is hiding. He recently became part of the DCO team and now helps Martin.
Tina Majorino as Maggie Harris, the rookie member of the DCO team and an expert data manipulator.
Steve Harris as Nelson Gates, director of the DCO task force.
Amber Valletta as Sonya Odum, Martin's estranged wife.
Mason Cook as Aiden Odum, Martin's pre-teen son.
Rob Mayes as Troy Quinn, a member of the DCO team.

Season 2
Sean Bean as Martin Odum
Steve Kazee as Curtis Ballard
Winter Ave Zoli as Gabrielle Miskova
Klára Issová as Ilyana Crawford
Aisling Franciosi as Kate Crawford
Kelly Overton as Nina Brenner
Ralph Brown as Terrence Graves
Anna Rust as Khava Bazaeva
Morris Chestnut as Tony Rice (guest star)
Nikola Đuričko as Tamir Zakayev
Gershwyn Eustache Jr as Simon Hardy
Adnan Hasković as General-President Arsanov
Eric Godon as older Ivanenko
Igor Skvarica as Beslan

Production

Music
The score of season 2 concludes with "Until We Go Down" by Ruelle, played during the climax of "The Legend of Alexei Volkov". Prior to this, the song was introduced to television as the opening theme of The Shannara Chronicles.

Episodes

Season 1 (2014)

Season 2 (2015)

Broadcast
Internationally, the series premiered in Australia on 11 November 2015 on FX.

Saudi Arabia and the rest of the Middle East & North Africa
On the 4th of February 2016, BBC First HD started airing the first episode of the second season of the series on OSN (Orbit Showtime Network).

Critical reception
Legends scored 59 out of 100 on Metacritic based on 27 "mixed or average" reviews. The review aggregator website Rotten Tomatoes reported a 56% critics rating with an average rating of 6/10 based on 32 reviews. The website consensus reads: "Legends lacks originality, but derives watchability from Sean Bean's fine central performance".

Development
With its second season, it was revealed Legends would be ‘’reimagined’’. The show would now focus on Bean's character's identity, with most of the original cast being replaced and the initial California setting was replaced for London and continental Europe (Paris and Prague). British veteran TV-directors Jamie Payne  (Indian Summers, The White Queen, The Hour) and Alrick Riley (Hustle, Spooks/MI-5, CSI)  were added to the show. Ken Biller (Legend of the Seeker, Perception) became the new showrunner/executive producer/lead writer, and developed a brand new nonlinear storyline taking place in different countries and flashbacks to Bean's character's childhood at a  British boarding school and scenes from Prague in 2001.

Promotion
To promote the series, TNT launched an intensive advertising campaign targeted at social media beginning at the 2014 San Diego Comic Con. Exploiting Sean Bean's reputation for varied and colorful on-screen deaths, the campaign centered around the hashtag #DontKillSeanBean, and included Bean's image on airport machinery and pillars, a poster covering multiple floors of a hotel adjoining the SDCC site, and widely distributed black T-shirts emblazoned with the hashtag in white.  Producer Howard Gordon tweeted images of celebrities, including Kiefer Sutherland, Game of Thrones author George R. R. Martin and Bean himself wearing the T-shirt. The ad campaign quickly went viral on social media and became the central focus of publicity done by Bean, including a parody by the website Funny or Die.

DVD release

References

External links
 
 

2014 American television series debuts
2015 American television series endings
2010s American crime drama television series
American action television series
English-language television shows
Television series about the Federal Bureau of Investigation
Television series by 20th Century Fox Television
Television shows based on American novels
Television shows set in Los Angeles
TNT (American TV network) original programming